The Red Bank Fire was one of a series of wildfires in Tehama County, California, 25 miles west of Red Bluff. The Red Bank fire was ignited from a series lightning strikes and erupted out of control on Thursday, September 5, 2019. The blaze, along with the South and Henthrone fires, is burning in a remote location, 30 miles south of Redding, California. Two structures were destroyed.

Events
The fire, which has been deemed to be lightning-caused, was reported burning in the early afternoon hours of Thursday, September 5, in the area of Hammer Loop Road and Petty John Road amid critical fire weather conditions. Petty John Road to the boundary of Shasta Trinity National Forest was put under mandatory evacuation, as well as Red Bank Oaks subdivision. Evacuations were also put in place for the area west of Highway 36 from Tedoc to Vestal and all road south of that.

As of Friday, September 6, those evacuations remained in place as the fire continued to grow in size, however it was largely consuming land used for cattle grazing. The fire was also reported to be a mere 5% contained that day. Meanwhile, the South fire had erupted from  Friday morning to  acres by that night due to limited access caused by the activity of the Red Bank fire.

The fire was contained on September 13. Two structures were destroyed.

Impact

The areas south of Highway 36 between Tedoc Road and Vestal Road, and between the Shasta-Trinity National Forest boundary and the Four Corners intersection were under mandatory evacuation.

See also
2019 California wildfires

References

Sources

Footnotes

2019 California wildfires
Wildfires in Tehama County, California